Bocharovsky is a rural locality (a khutor) and the administrative center of Bocharovskoye Rural Settlement, Novoanninsky District, Volgograd Oblast, Russia. The population was 583 as of 2010. There are 15 streets.

Geography 
Bocharovsky is located in steppe on the Khopyorsko-Buzulukskaya Plain, 250 km from Volgograd, 19 km south of Novoanninsky (the district's administrative centre) by road. Kuznetsovsky is the nearest rural locality.

References 

Rural localities in Novoanninsky District